Papyrus 50 (Gregory-Aland), designated by 𝔓50, is an early copy of a small part of the New Testament in Greek. It is a papyrus manuscript of the Acts of the Apostles, it contains Acts 8:26-32; 10:26-31. The manuscript palaeographically has been assigned to the 3rd/4th century. Elijah Hixson suggests that the manuscript may possibly be a forgery based on anomalies in line spacing, some text seeming to wrap around lacunae, and serious issues with fiber alignment in the papyrus.

Description 

The Greek text of this codex is mixed. It has some orthographical peculiarities and corrections. Aland placed it in Category III. The text generally concurs with Codex Sinaiticus and Vaticanus.

The nomina sacra are contracted (ΙΛΗΜ, ΠΝΑ, ΑΝΟΣ, ΑΝΟΝ, ΘΣ, ΘΥ, ΚΥ).

The manuscript was purchased in Paris by Yale University in 1933 along with other manuscripts of Egyptian provenance. The text of the codex was published in 1937 by Carl H. Kraeling.

It is currently housed at the Beinecke Rare Book and Manuscript Library at Yale University (P.CtYBR inv. 1543) in New Haven.

See also 
 Acts of the Apostles: chapter 8 and 10
 List of New Testament papyri

References

Further reading 

 Carl H. Kraeling, Two Selections from Acts, in: Robert P.Casey, Silva Lake i Agnes K. Lake: Studies Presented to KIBSOPP LAKE by Pupils, Colleagues and Friends. 1937, s. 163–172. 
 Philip W. Comfort, The Text of the Earliest New Testament Greek Manuscripts, Tyndale House Publishers, 2001, p. 362-364.

External links 
 Image 𝔓50 recto 
 Image 𝔓50 verso

New Testament papyri
4th-century biblical manuscripts
Acts of the Apostles papyri